Basarrate is a station on lines 1 and 2 of the Bilbao metro. The station is located in the neighborhood of Santutxu, in the district of Begoña, in Bilbao. It opened on 5 July 1997.

Station layout 

Basarrate station follows the typical cavern-shaped layout of most underground Metro Bilbao stations designed by Norman Foster, with the main hall located directly above the rail tracks.

Access 

  3 Pintor Losada St. - Campa de Basarrate (Basarrate exit)
   Iturriaga St. and Marqués de Laurencín St. (Ascensor Iturriaga exit)

Services 
The station is served by line 1 from Etxebarri to Ibarbengoa and Plentzia, and by line 2 from Basauri to Kabiezes. The station is located in close proximity to a Bilbobus stop served by the San Ignacio-Txurdinaga (13) and Santutxu-Biribila Plaza (40) lines.

References

External links
 

Line 1 (Bilbao metro) stations
Line 2 (Bilbao metro) stations
Buildings and structures in Bilbao
Railway stations in Spain opened in 1997
1997 establishments in the Basque Country (autonomous community)